The Graduate School of Business Administration Zurich (GSBA Zurich) was an unaccredited business school in Switzerland. 
 
The school was founded in 1968 as "Oekreal Management Zentrum," offering Swiss professional degrees. At times, it may have operated as a diploma mill but gained some accreditation in the 2010s, albeit was not accredited by the Swiss government.

In July 2009 Peter Lorange, former IMD president, bought GSBA Zurich.

In 2015, GSBA was acquired by the China Europe International Business School and subsequently merged into it.

References

External links
 Information about the GSBA Zürich (Lorange Institute of Business Zürich)
 Dual Degree Smith-GSBA

Business education
Business schools in Switzerland